Byron Daniel Chamberlain (born October 17, 1971) is a former professional American football tight end in the National Football League. He played professionally for the Denver Broncos, Minnesota Vikings, and the Washington Redskins. Chamberlain won back-to-back Super Bowl championships as a member of the Denver Broncos (XXXII & XXXIII). He was voted to the 2002 Pro Bowl while with the Vikings.

Early life
Chamberlain was born in Honolulu, Hawaii. Byron grew up in San Diego, CA. After his mother remarried, his family moved to Texas. He attended and graduated from Eastern Hills High School in Fort Worth, Texas. Chamberlain was a star in football, baseball and track for the Highlanders.

College career
Chamberlain's  started his college career at the University of Missouri, where he made the All-Big Eight Conference freshman team. Chamberlain transferred to Wayne State College, a Division II College in Nebraska where he was a standout wide receiver from 1993-1994 and  broke most of the receiving records. In his two seasons with the Wildcats, Chamberlain had 161 catches for 1,941 yards and 14 touchdowns and became the school's all-time leading receiver, In 1993, Chamberlain had 78 catches for 1,015 yards and seven touchdowns to help the 9-1 Wildcats lead NCAA Division II in total offense that season.  He added another 83 catches for 926 yards in 1994.  The 83 catches tied most in a single season by a Wildcat receiver and his 16 catches vs. Bemidji State that season ranked most in a single game by a WSC receiver. His quarterback was Brett Salisbury, both were roommates and eventual Harlon Hill Trophy finalists. Chamberlain and Salisbury are the only two players to ever be nominated in the school's history for the Harlon Hill Award.

Wayne State teammates Chamberlain, Salisbury, Brad Ottis, and Damon Thomas (American football) all went on to professional careers.

Professional career
Chamberlain was drafted by the Denver Broncos in the 7th round (222nd overall) of the 1995 NFL Draft. He played in the NFL for nine seasons. Byron played for Denver Broncos, Minnesota Vikings, and the Washington Redskins in his career.  

He spent the 1996 World League season with the Rhein Fire in Germany and led the league with 58 receptions for 685 yards (11.8) and a league leading 8 touchdowns. 

Byron was a key contributor as a member of the Denver Broncos back-to-back Super Bowl wins (Super Bowl XXXII & XXXIII). He was voted to the 2002 Pro Bowl while with the Minnesota Vikings. Byron finished his career with 167 catches for 2,048 yards (12.3) with 6 touchdowns.

NFL career statistics

Personal life
In August 1997, Chamberlain pleaded guilty to harassment charges against his then-wife, Robyn. He was placed on probation for two years. He also was ordered to pay a $138 fine and be evaluated for drug use. Less than a month later, he was arrested and faced domestic violence charges. 

In 2003, Chamberlain was cut by the Vikings following a four-game suspension for using the weight-loss drug ephedra. Subsequently, he signed by the Redskins and cut again.

In the fall of 2008, Chamberlain returned to Wayne State in Wayne, Nebraska to complete his degree. Friday, December 19, 2008, Chamberlain received his bachelor's degree in Communications.

Chamberlain started the Byron Chamberlain Foundation in 2000 to assist underserved individuals and communities. Some of the foundations programs have included sports camps for underprivileged kids, clothes and shoe drives, food drives, toy drives as well as health education. 

Chamberlain is married to business developer, Angelique Chamberlain.

References

External links
 Pro-Football-Reference.Com: Byron Chamberlain
 databaseFootball.cm: Byron Chamberlain
 Byron Chamberlain Foundation

1971 births
Living people
Sportspeople from Hawaii
American football tight ends
Denver Broncos players
Minnesota Vikings players
Washington Redskins players
National Conference Pro Bowl players
Wayne State Wildcats football players
Rhein Fire players
American expatriate players of American football